Marigold is a yellow-orange color. It is named after the flower of the same name.

It is currently unknown when marigold was first used as a colour name, although the New Zealand author Katherine Mansfield used it to describe a hair colour in her short story Something Childish But Very Natural (1914).

Variations of marigold

Gold

Gold, also called golden, is one of a variety of yellow-orange color blends used to give the impression of the color of the element gold.

The web color gold is sometimes referred to as golden to distinguish it from the color metallic gold. The use of gold as a color term in traditional usage is more often applied to the color "metallic gold".

The first recorded use of golden as a color name in English was in 1300.

Yellow-orange

Yellow-orange has been a Crayola crayon color since 1930.

Orange-yellow

Orange-yellow was a Crayola crayon color from 1958 to 1990.

Goldenrod

Displayed at right is the web color goldenrod.

The color goldenrod is a representation of the color of some of the deeper gold colored goldenrod flowers.

The first recorded use of goldenrod as a color name in English was in 1915.

See also
Gold (color)
List of colors

References